Mariya Telushkina (Kazakh: Мария Телушкина; born 3 April 1994) is a Kazakhstani athlete specialising in the discus throw. She represented her country at the 2016 Summer Olympics without qualifying for the final.

Her personal best in the event is 61.20 metres set is Tashkent in 2016.

International competitions

References

1994 births
Living people
Kazakhstani discus throwers
Athletes (track and field) at the 2016 Summer Olympics
Olympic athletes of Kazakhstan